The discography of Vanessa Hudgens consists of two studio albums, five soundtrack albums, thirteen singles, and seven music videos. Hudgens has also recorded several other releases as her High School Musical character Gabriella Montez in the High School Musical film series' soundtracks. The songs she has recorded entered several international music charts and most of them were duets with the cast members of the High School Musical series. Hudgens' biggest hit song is the High School Musical duet "Breaking Free", which peaked at number four on the Billboard Hot 100 chart.

In 2006, Hudgens signed a record deal with Hollywood Records. Her debut solo studio album, V, was released on September 26, 2006 in the United States. The album reached number twenty-four on the Billboard 200, selling over 34,000 copies in its first week. In February 2007, the album was certified Gold for shipments of 500,000 copies to U.S. retailers. The album has sold 570,000 copies in the United States as of April 2008 and was certified Platinum in Argentina for sales of 8,000 copies. Hudgens' second solo studio album, Identified, was released on July 1, 2008 in North America and reached number twenty-three on the Billboard 200, selling 22,000 copies in its first week in the US.

Albums

Studio albums

Soundtrack albums

Singles

As lead artist

As featured artist

Promotional singles

Other charted songs

Other appearances

Music videos

Notes

Citations

External links
 Vanessa Hudgens Official website 

Discographies of American artists
Pop music discographies
Discography